Musayev, Labazanova and Magomadov v. Russia was the July 26, 2007, ruling by the European Court of Human Rights (ECHR) in the case of the February 2000 Novye Aldi massacre in Chechnya, which unanimously held Russia responsible for violations of Articles 2 (right to life) and 13 (right to effective remedy) of the European Convention of Human Rights. The three applications, which the Court joined into one case, concerned the murders of 11 civilian persons committed during a rampage in the Chechen capital Grozny by the Russian OMON special police unit.

In its ruling, the Court said:

See also
Estamirov and Others v. Russia

External links
CASE OF MUSAYEV AND OTHERS v. RUSSIA (Applications nos. 57941/00, 58699/00 and 60403/00) JUDGMENT
European Court Rules Against Russia In Chechen Deaths, Radio Free Europe/Radio Liberty, July 26, 2007
Russia: European Court Rules on Chechnya Massacre, Reuters AlertNet, 27 Jul 2007
Russia Ordered to Pay Relatives of 11 Chechens Killed by Troops, The New York Times, July 27, 2007
Kremlin is condemned for Chechen massacre, The Times, July 27, 2007
Chechen Massacre Survivors See Justice, Institute for War and Peace Reporting, 09-Aug-07

Article 2 of the European Convention on Human Rights
Article 13 of the European Convention on Human Rights
European Court of Human Rights cases involving Russia
Human rights in Chechnya
2007 in case law
2007 in Russia